Gandab-e Sofla (also Romanized as Gandāb-e Soflá) is a village in Horr Rural District, Dinavar District, Sahneh County, Kermanshah Province, Iran. At the 2006 census, its population was 76, in 18 families.

References 

Populated places in Sahneh County